Ledinek is a settlement  in the Municipality of Sveta Ana in the Slovene Hills in northeastern Slovenia.

References

External links
Ledinek on Geopedia

Populated places in the Municipality of Sveta Ana